Imre Földes, born Imre Fleischmann, also known as Emmerich Feld (15 September 1881, Kaposvár - 30 April 1958, Budapest) was a Hungarian playwright and librettist.

Biography
He originally worked as a government official in Budapest. In his spare time, he wrote historical plays in verse. His first work to receive a performance, in 1904, was A Király Arája (The King's Bride), which was presented at the National Theatre. A long series of Romantic dramas followed; three of which won awards from the Hungarian Academy of Sciences.
 
Much of his audience appeal was derived from his handling of social topics. In A Császár Katonái (The Emperor's Soldiers, 1908), he depicted the anti-Hungarian attitudes that were widespread in the Austro-Hungarian Army.  In Hivatalnok Urak (The Clerks, 1909), he portrays the lives of government officials who behave like the public's masters, while unable to solve their own daily problems.  

Critics described his plays as "more or less Socialist oriented" and filled with "shocking" scenes. He was especially good at portraying the Jewish community of Budapest. In his later works, the criticisms are somewhat muted. 

He also wrote some light comedies, in the style of Edmond Rostand, and co-authored librettos for operettas; notably Viktória and Hawaii rózsája. He published a number of short stories in newspapers and magazines as well.

Filmography  

 Seefestspiele Mörbisch: Viktoria und ihr Husar (TV Movie) (play) 2016 
 Blomman från Hawaii (TV Movie) (as Emric Foeldes) 1992 
 Csalással nem! (TV Movie) 1989 
 Hivatalnok urak (novel) 1984 
 Victoria und ihr Husar (TV Movie) (operetta) 1975 
 Die Blume von Hawaii (TV Movie) (libretto - as Emmerich Földes) 1971 
 Viktoria und ihr Husar (TV Movie) (operetta - as Emric Foeldes) 1965  
 Viktoria ja hänen husaarinsa (TV Movie) (as Emric Foeldes) 1963 
 Szíriusz (play) 1942 
 Évforduló (idea) 1936 
 Le cas du docteur Brenner (play "A Kuruzslo" - as Emric Foeldes) 1933 
 Alias the Doctor (play "A Kuruzslo" - as Emric Foeldes) 1932  
 Victoria and Her Hussar (operetta - as Emric Foeldes) 1931 
 A Man's Past (play "Diploma" - as Emric Foeldes) 1927 
 Nameless (play - as Emmerich Földes) 1923 
 Mindent egy asszonyért! 1922 
 Hivatalnok urak 1919 
 Soldiers of the Emperor (play) 1918 
 The Charlatan (Also known as. A Kuruzsló) 1917 
 A paradicsom (screenplay) 1915 
 Captive Souls (Also known as Rablélek) (screenplay) 1914

References

Further reading
 Szabolcsi Miklós (Ed.): A magyar irodalom története (History of Hungarian Literature), Vol.5, Budapest: Akadémiai Kiadó (1965), -5

External links
 Imre Földes @ IMDb
 Magyar életrajzi lexikon,  Vol. (A–K). Kenyeres Ágnes. Budapest: Akadémiai. 1967. 
 Magyar zsidó lexikon Ujvári Péter (Ed.) 1929

1881 births
1958 deaths
20th-century Hungarian dramatists and playwrights
Hungarian librettists
People from Kaposvár
20th-century Hungarian male writers
Hungarian male dramatists and playwrights